Aerated static pile (ASP) composting refers to any of a number of systems used to biodegrade organic material without physical manipulation during primary composting. The blended admixture is usually placed on perforated piping, providing air circulation for controlled aeration.  
It may be in windrows, open or covered, or in closed containers.  With regard to complexity and cost, aerated systems are most commonly used by larger, professionally managed composting facilities, although the technique may range from very small, simple systems to very large, capital intensive, industrial installations.

Aerated static piles offer process control for rapid biodegradation, and work well for facilities processing wet materials and large volumes of feedstocks. ASP facilities can be under roof or outdoor windrow composting operations, or totally enclosed in-vessel composting, sometimes referred to tunnel composting.

Aeration

The aeration system uses fans to push and/or pull air through the composting mass. Rigid or flexible perforated piping, connected to fans, delivers the air. The pipes can be installed in channels, on top of a floor, or included throughout the pile during buildup.

In large-scale systems, forced aeration is accompanied with a computerized monitoring system responsible for controlling the rate and schedule of air delivery to the composting mass, although meters and manual monitoring techniques may also be used in smaller scale operations.

Advantages of this composting method include the ability to maintain the proper moisture and oxygen levels for the microbial populations to operate at peak efficiency to reduce pathogens, while preventing excess heat, which can crash the system.  Aerated systems also facilitate the use of biofilters to treat process air to remove particulates and mitigate odors prior to venting. However, aerated systems can dry out quickly and must be monitored closely to maintain desired moisture levels.

In Thailand this system has been used by 470 farmer groups. (May, 2008). The process required 30 days to finish without turning, with 10 metric tons of compost (10 piles) obtained each time. A 15-inch squirrel-cage blower was used to force the air through 10 static piles of compost, one at a time, for 15 minute periods twice a day. The raw materials consisted of agricultural wastes and animal manure in the ratio of 3:1 by volume.

See also
List of composting systems
Anaerobic digestion
In-vessel composting
List of solid waste treatment technologies
Windrow composting

References

Composting
Industrial composting